The 1870 Birthday Honours were appointments by Queen Victoria to various orders and honours to reward and highlight good works by citizens of the British Empire. The appointments were made to celebrate the official birthday of the Queen, and were published in The London Gazette on 31 May 1870.  

The recipients of honours are displayed here as they were styled before their new honour, and arranged by honour, with classes (Knight, Knight Grand Cross, etc.) and then divisions (Military, Civil, etc.) as appropriate.

United Kingdom and British Empire

The Most Exalted Order of the Star of India

Knight Grand Commander (GCSI)

His Highness Mahendra Singh, Maharaja of Patiala
The Nawab Salar Jung Bahadoor  Minister of the Hyderabad State

Knight Commander (KCSI)
His Highness Prince Gholam Mahomed
William Grey, Bengal Civil Service, Lieutenant-Governor of Bengal

Companion (CSI)
Alexander John Arbuthnot, Madras Civil Service, Member of the Council of the Governor of Madras
Edward Clive Bayley, Bengal Civil Service, Secretary to Government of India, Home Department
The Rajah Jai Kishan Das, Deputy Magistrate at Allyghur
Colonel Michael Dawes, late Bengal Artillery
Colonel Henry Errington Longden  late Adjutant-General of the Bengal Army
Colonel Henry Edward Landor Thuillier, Royal (late Bengal) Artillery, Surveyor-General in India
Colonel John Cumming Anderson, Royal (late Madras) Engineers, formerly Chief Engineer at Lucknow
Colonel Martin Dillon  Rifle Brigade, Military Secretary to the Commander-in-Chief in India
Baboo Shiva Persad, of Benares, Educational Department

References

Birthday Honours
1870 awards
1870 in India
1870 in the United Kingdom